The Taipei Mission in Korea (Hanja:駐韓國 臺北 代表部) represents the interests of Taiwan in South Korea, functioning as a de facto embassy in the absence of diplomatic relations.

Its South Korean counterpart is the Korean Mission in Taipei.

History
The Mission was established on 25 January 1994. following an agreement on July 27, 1993. This was after South Korea ceased to recognise the government in Taipei as the Republic of China, following the establishment of relations with the People's Republic of China on 27 August 1992.

On September 1, 2004, representatives of the two countries' missions signed an aviation agreement allowing aircraft of each side to enter the airspace of the other, permitting the resumption of direct scheduled flights by Korean and Taiwanese airlines, which had been discontinued in 1992.

Busan office
There is also a branch office in Busan, the country's second largest city. This was originally established as the Consulate of the Republic of China.

Representatives

See also
 Taipei Economic and Cultural Representative Office
 Korean Mission in Taipei
 South Korea–Taiwan relations

References

 

South Korea
Taiwan
1993 establishments in South Korea
Organizations established in 1994
South Korea–Taiwan relations
Jongno District